Markéta Štroblová-Schlögl, known professionally as Little Caprice, is a Czech pornographic actress, model and producer.

Biography 
Štroblová was born in Brno, Czechoslovakia (now Czech Republic). After completing a degree in nutrition, she worked in the food and beverage industry. She began working in the pornography industry in 2008 at Video Art Holland, under various pseudonyms including "Lola" and "Little Caprice". In 2011, Štroblová took a break for health reasons and left the company, later returning to the industry working independently.

In 2014, she appeared in an interactive erotic online game operated by the Munich red-light milieu company, Villa Roma. Further productions followed, such as MetArt, Nubile Films, Babes.com and X-Art. Then in 2015 a lingerie presentation earned her fifth place in the ranking as Actress of the Year in Playboy. In August 2016, Štroblová-Schlögl launched her own website with Littlecaprice.cz. She was a streaker in a promotional video for the beverage brand Almdudler and won the AVN Award's Best Scene in a Foreign-Shot Production and Best Website. In 2020, Little Caprice won the AVN Award for Female Foreign Performer of the Year.

Awards 
 2016: AVN Award - Nominated Best Sex Scene in a Foreign-Shot Production with Marcello Bravo
 2016: AVN Award - Nominated Best Website Newcomer littlecaprice-dreams.com/
 2018: XBIZ Award Winner Best Sex Scene with Marcello Bravo
 2018: 8 times AVN Award - Nominated 
 2018: Venus Award - Best Actress International
 2018 : Best Newcomer Website - littlecaprice-dreams.com (Production Company)
 2018: Best Erotic Website 2018 Republic Czech (littlecaprice-dreams.com)
 2019: AVN Award - 7 times Nominated
 2019: Best Membership Website 2019 EU - Athens Erotic Art
 2019: Best Actress 2019 EU - Athens Erotic Art
 2019: AVN: Vixen Angel Feb. 2019
 2019: Venus Award - Best Actress International
 2020: AVN - AVN Award for Female Foreign Performer of the Year
 2021: AVN Las Vegas 11 times nominated
 2021: AVN Las Vegas Winner Best Foreign-Shot All-Girl Sex Scene
 2021: XBIZ Award Winner Best performer director Website 
 2022: AVN - AVN Award for Female Foreign Performer of the Year
 2022: AVN - AVN Award for Best International Lesbian Sex Scene
 2022: AVN - AVN Award for Best International Group Sex Scene
 2022: XBIZ Award Winner Best performer director Website 
 2023: AVN - AVN Award for Female Foreign Performer of the Year
 2023: AVN Award for Best International All-Girl Sex Scene

References

External links 
 
 Personal blog

1980s births
Artists from Brno
Czech female adult models
Czech pornographic film actresses
Czech pornographic film producers
Czechoslovak actresses
Living people

AVN Award winners